Battle in the Valley was a professional wrestling pay-per-view (PPV) event produced by New Japan Pro-Wrestling (NJPW). It took place on November 13, 2021, at San Jose Civic in San Jose, California.

Production

Background
In October 2019, NJPW announced their expansion into the United States with their new American division, New Japan Pro-Wrestling of America. On August 14, 2021 at Resurgence, NJPW announced Battle in the Valley for November 13 at San Jose Civic in San Jose, California. The event saw the NJPW debuts of Buddy Matthews and Jonah, and Kazuchika Okada making his first US appearance since 2019.

Storylines
Battle in the Valley featured professional wrestling matches that involve different wrestlers from pre-existing scripted feuds and storylines. Wrestlers portrayed villains, heroes, or less distinguishable characters in the scripted events that built tension and culminated in a wrestling match or series of matches.

Results

References

2021 in professional wrestling
2021 in California
Events in California
November 2021 events in the United States
Professional wrestling in San Jose, California
New Japan Pro-Wrestling shows